The Ghana Investment Fund for Electronic Communications (GIFEC) was established as an implementing agency of the Ministry of Communications, in January 2004, with the formulation of the comprehensive ICT for Accelerated Development (ICT4AD) Policy, which seeks to engineer an ICT-led socio-economic development process with the potential to transform Ghana into a middle income, information-rich, knowledge-based and technology driven economy and society The legislation that strengthened the agency was promulgated in 2008 as the Electronic Communications Act 775, aimed at providing for electronic communications, broadcasting, and the use of the electro-magnetic spectrum and related facilities in Ghana. The promulgation of the Electronic Communications Act, 2008 (Act 775) gave legal backing to the organisation, thereby changing its name to Ghana Investment Fund for Electronic Communications (GIFEC), as well as giving it an expanded mandate and scope. It is  the Government of Ghana agency established to facilitate the implementation of universal access to electronic communication and the provision of internet to under-served and un-served communities, facilitate capacity building programmes and promote ICT. 

The Ghana Investment Fund for Electronic Communications

Operation 
The scope of operations of GIFEC as enshrined in section 32 of Act 775 mandates the organisation to facilitate the implementation of universal access to electronic communication and the provision of internet point of presence in underserved and unserved communities, facilitate capacity building programs and promote ICT inclusion in the unserved and underserved communities, facilitate capacity building programmes, promote ICT inclusion in unserved and underserved communities,  the deployment of ICT equipment to educational, vocational and other training institutions.

Funding 
The financial Resource of the Fund is provided by:

 Licensed Mobile Network Operators and
 Internet Service Providers (ISPs)
 Parliament
 Interests accrued from investments
 Objective

Objective 
To facilitate the provision of Universal Access to all persons through the use of affordable Information and Communications Technology for Socio-economic development.

Mission 
To provide financial resources for the establishment of universal service and access for all communities in Ghana, and facilitate the provision of basic telephony, internet, multimedia broadband and broadcasting services to these communities.

Vision 
To bridge the digital divide between the served and unserved/underserved communities in Ghana

GIFEC Board of Trustees 
The Ghana Investment Fund for Electronic Communications is governed by a board of trustees comprising the following ministries/organizations, with the Chairperson appointed by the President of the Republic of Ghana:

 Ministry of Communications and Digitalisation
 Parliamentary Select Committee on Communications
 National Communications Authority (NCA)
 Four (4) members from the Industry Forum
 Administrator of GIFEC

Administrators (CEOs) OF GIFEC 
Current Administrator (CEO)- Mr. Prince Ofosu Sefa

Past Administrators (CEOs) 

 Hon. Abraham Kofi Asante (2004 - May 2009)

References 

Ministries and Agencies of State of Ghana
Economy of Ghana